The 1995 Iowa Hawkeyes football team represented the University of Iowa in the 1995 NCAA Division I-A football season. Participating as members of the Big Ten Conference, the Hawkeyes played their home games at Kinnick Stadium and were led by coach Hayden Fry. The Hawkeyes finished with an overall record of 8–4 (4–4 Big Ten), and earned a victory over Washington in the Sun Bowl.

Schedule

Roster

Rankings

Game summaries

Northern Iowa

Iowa State

New Mexico State

Michigan State

Led by tailback Sedrick Shaw (42 carries, 250 yards, TD), the Hawkeyes rolled up 524 yards of total offense (311 rushing) to earn a road victory over the Spartans in the 1995 Big Ten opener.

Indiana

Penn State

The Hawkeyes led 27-24 after a 19-yard touchdown run from Sedrick Shaw early in the 4th quarter, but Penn State rallied to score the final 17 points of the game.

Ohio State

The Buckeyes, led by future NFL Pro Bowl selections Eddie George, Terry Glenn, and Shawn Springs, rolled to a 56-0 lead in the first half before cruising to the 21-point victory.

Illinois

{{Americanfootballbox
|bg=
|bg2=
|titlestyle=; text-align:center
|state=collapsed
|title=Illinois Fighting Illini at Iowa Hawkeyes 
|date=November 4, 1995
|time=11:30 a.m. CST
|road=Illinois
|R1= 3|R2= 7|R3=6 |R4=10
|home=Iowa
|H1=0 |H2= 7|H3= 0|H4=0
|stadium=Kinnick Stadium, Iowa City, Iowa
|attendance=70,397
|weather=
|referee=
|TV=ESPN
|TVAnnouncers=
|reference=Box score and Game recap
|scoring=
First quarter
ILL - Scheuplein 24-yard field goal ILL 3–0
Second quarter
IOWA - Tim Dwight 12-yard pass from Matt Sherman (Bromert kick) IOWA 7–3
ILL - Cushing 5-yard pass from Johnson (Scheuplein kick) ILL 10–7
Third quarter
ILL - Havard 35-yard run (run failed) ''ILL 16–7Fourth quarterILL - Scheuplein 19-yard field goal ILL 19–7ILL - Douthard 3-yard run (Scheuplein kick) ILL 26–7|stats=
}}Sources:'''

Northwestern

ESPN's College GameDay was in Evanston for this matchup between the Hawkeyes and the #5 Wildcats. After leading 20-17 at halftime, Iowa couldn't muster a second half score. Northwestern had a magical season, capped by the school's first trip to the Rose Bowl in 46 years.

Wisconsin

Minnesota

Sun Bowl

The young Hawkeyes bullied the Pac-10 co-Champion and 20th-ranked Huskies, leading 21–0 at half and 38–6 early in the 4th quarter before cruising to a 20-point victory. Sedrick Shaw and Tavian Banks each ran for over 100 yards, as Iowa outgained Washington 229–90 on the ground. Iowa kickers combined for 5 field goals to stretch the lead in the first half.

Iowa ended the season on a 3-game winning streak, earning a #25 ranking in the final AP poll and a #22 ranking in the final Coaches' poll.

This was the Hawkeyes' first win over a ranked opponent since the 1991 season, and Iowa's first bowl victory since the 1987 Holiday Bowl.

Coaching in his final game, longtime Defensive Coordinator Bill Brashier referred to this Sun Bowl victory as his most memorable.

Awards and honors

Team players in the 1996 NFL Draft

References

Iowa
Iowa Hawkeyes football seasons
Sun Bowl champion seasons
Iowa Hawkeyes football